FEV or Fev may refer to:

Sport 
 Brendan Fevola (born 1981), Australian Rules footballer
 Featherstone Rovers, an English rugby league club
 Liga FEV; see Volleyball in Spain

Other uses 
 Fidelity European Values, a British investment trust
 Forced expiratory volume
 Full electric vehicle
, an internationally recognized leader in the design and development of internal combustion engines, conventional, electric, and alternative vehicle drive systems, energy technology, and a major supplier of advanced testing and instrumentation products and services to some of the world's largest OEMs
 Xiaohu FEV, Chinese electric car

See also

 fuel cell electric vehicle
 
 fever (disambiguation)
 feve (disambiguation)